MacGregor High School is a continuation high school located in Albany, California, United States. It is part of the Albany Unified School District.

Students at MacGregor are individuals who are considered at-risk at Albany High School, and were recommended to attend MacGregor by a counselor. Often, they are behind in college credit and are not likely to graduate at their current pace.

Instead of a traditional semester schedule, MacGregor operates on six week periods, as students are likely to rejoin Albany High School when performance improves.

The student population is around 55.

In the fall of 2008 MacGregor founded its first ever student government and elected a student body president.

External links
 MacGregor High School

References

Educational institutions in the United States with year of establishment missing
Albany Unified School District
High schools in Alameda County, California
Continuation high schools in California
Public high schools in California